KBRL (1300 AM) is a radio station broadcasting a news/talk format. Licensed to McCook, Nebraska, United States, the station is currently owned by Armada Media.

History
The station went on the air on Sept. 26, 1947 as KBRL, a radio station built by Roy Lenwell.  Lenwell retired and sold the station to Edwin S Towell III from Falls City, NE in 1972.  The Santee Family purchased the station in January 1977.  The station became a country station in 1977 and was sold to Jerry Venable and his bunch from KFNF in September 1981, and changed the calls to KSWN on 1982-10-11. On 1990-04-03, the station changed its call sign back to the current KBRL.

References

Source for on air date Broadcasting Yearbook 1961
http://www.americanradiohistory.com/Archive-BC-YB/1961-62/Section%20B%202%20Radio%20%20Broadcasting%20Yearbook%201961-1962-10.pdf

External links

BRL
Radio stations established in 1946
1946 establishments in Nebraska